Candelaria is a municipality and town in the Colombian department of Atlántico.

References

External links
 Candelaria official website
 Gobernacion del Atlantico - Candelaria

Municipalities of Atlántico Department